Caragana sinica is a species belonging to the genus Caragana.

Caragana sinica is known to produce the stilbenoid trimers α-viniferin, showing acetylcholinesterase inhibitory activity, and miyabenol C, a protein kinase C inhibitor and two stilbene tetramers kobophenol A, and carasinol B.

References

Hedysareae
Medicinal plants of Asia